The  were mounted bodyguards for Toyotomi Hideyoshi at the battle of Shizugatake in 1583. At the decisive moment in the battle, Hideyoshi ordered them to leave the position and charge at the opposing army of Shibata Katsuie. After Hideyoshi gained control of Japan, many of the members were promoted to Daimyō.

The Seven Spears of Shizugatake were the following Samurai:

Fukushima Masanori (1561–1624)
Hirano Nagayasu (1559–1628)
Kasuya Takenori (1562–1607)
Katagiri Katsumoto (1556–1615)
Katō Kiyomasa (1562–1611)
Katō Yoshiaki (1563–1631)
Wakizaka Yasuharu (1554–1626)

Fukushima, Katō Kiyomasa and Katō Yoshiaki were given large benefices by Hideyoshi, 240,000 Koku in Owari Province, 195,000 Koku in Higo Province and 100,000 Koku in Iyo Province, respectively. The rest of the members remained as a small retainer of some thousands Koku. 

At the Battle of Sekigahara and Siege of Osaka, all of them betrayed Toyotomi Hideyori, the son of Hideyoshi, with the exception of Kasuya Takenori who fought at Sekigahara under Ishida Mitsunari. The rest took the part of Tokugawa Ieyasu and Takenori was later pardoned. After the foundation of the Tokugawa shogunate, they or their successors were ousted from their territories, except Hirano.

References

Lists of samurai
Samurai units

ja:賤ヶ岳の戦い#賤ヶ岳の七本槍